Mount Airy Historic District, also known as Mount Airy Park, is a national historic district located at Bethlehem, Lehigh County, Pennsylvania.  The district includes 27 contributing buildings in a residential area of Bethlehem.  It includes large, ornate residences built between 1910 and 1930.  A few date as early as 1895.

It was added to the National Register of Historic Places in 1988.

See also

 National Register of Historic Places listings in Lehigh County, Pennsylvania

References

External links

 Historic Preservation

Houses on the National Register of Historic Places in Pennsylvania
Historic districts on the National Register of Historic Places in Pennsylvania
Houses in Lehigh County, Pennsylvania
National Register of Historic Places in Lehigh County, Pennsylvania